Fleming College, also known as Sir Sandford Fleming College,  is an Ontario College of Applied Arts and Technology located in Peterborough, Ontario, Canada. The college has an enrollment of more than 6,800 full-time and 10,000 part-time students.

History

The college was named after the Scottish-born engineer and inventor Sandford Fleming, who is perhaps best known for his contributions to the concept of Universal Standard Time, and who was knighted in 1897 by Queen Victoria.

On 21 May 1965, legislation was introduced in Ontario establishing Colleges of Applied Arts and Technology by then Minister of Education William G. Davis. This historic occasion for education within Ontario marked the beginning of what would become, some 50 years later, a group of 21 Colleges of Applied Arts and Technology and 3 College Institutes of Technology and Advanced Learning.

Sir Sandford Fleming College was subsequently founded in 1967, with David B. Sutherland serving as its first president. Sutherland was the husband of Peterborough's longest-serving mayor, Sylvia Sutherland.

Organization
The college is governed by a Board of Governors  headed by the President and executive staff.

Campuses

Peterborough Campus
The main  campus of Fleming College is the Sutherland Campus in Peterborough. Other campuses are located in Cobourg, Haliburton (Haliburton School of Art + Design), and Lindsay (Frost Campus). The college's modern architecture was designed by Ronald Thom.

Sutherland Campus

The Dobbin farm was selected in 1967 for what would later be named the Sutherland Campus. In 1973, the first two phases of the site were opened, and in 1983, the site was named the Sutherland Campus in honour of the college's first and founding president. The Sutherland Campus underwent expansion, including a new on-campus residence in 2002 and a new technology wing in 2003.

St. Joseph's at Fleming, a cluster of eight resident homes for 200 people, opened in 2004 and is the first long-term care facility to be built on a college or university campus.

In 2005, the Peterborough Sport & Wellness Centre was constructed on campus to accommodate the college's athletic needs. Built in partnership with the City of Peterborough, the Wellness Centre provides athletic and aquatic facilities to students and the community. As well, the Fleming Sport Complex - two new artificial turf fields, change rooms and a field house - opened at the campus in October 2013.

The campus is home to the Kawartha Trades and Technology Centre (KTTC), which opened in 2014, and features Fleming's trades and technology programs.

McRae Building
In 1967 a campus opened in a renovated textile mill on McDonnel Street, and in 1968 the site was named the Stewart W. Daniel Building. The McRae building was also constructed on this same property in 1976. The site was home to Fleming College's trades programs but closed when the KTTC opened in 2014.

Cobourg Campus
The Cobourg Campus opened in 1971. Today the campus offers Academic Upgrading and Continuing Education/Corporate Training courses.

Haliburton Campus

In 1969, the Haliburton School of Fine Arts became part of Sir Sandford Fleming College. In 2004 the campus moved to a new location in Glebe Park on Head Lake in the Village of Haliburton, and today it is known as the Haliburton School of Art + Design. The campus offers full-time 14-week Art Certificates in Artist Blacksmithing, Drawing and Painting, Photo Arts, Digital Image Design, Sculpture, Ceramics, Glassblowing, Jewellery, and Fibre Arts. Students can combine these Certificate programs with a year of foundation credits to obtain a Visual and Creative Arts Diploma. Other programs offered at the campus include Expressive Arts, Sustainable Building Design and Construction, Continuing Education, and Academic Upgrading.

Haliburton School of Art + Design continues to run its short-duration summer arts courses, offering a selection of over 300 courses from May to August, open to people of all skill levels.

The Haliburton Sculpture Forest is located in the forested area of the campus. The Sculpture Forest features over 25 permanent sculptures by Canadian and International artists.

Frost Campus

St. Joseph's Convent was the original location of the college's Lindsay campus in 1967. The college acquired its own facilities by 1973 and, in turn, this site was named the Frost Campus (in honour of Leslie Frost). Frost Campus is Fleming's School of Environmental and Natural Resource Sciences, which focuses on environmental and natural resource education (including earth resources, fish and wildlife, and GIS). In 2004, the campus expanded with a new environmental technology wing.

The Frost Campus features a "living wall" - the first of its kind in a college environment - a green roof, a campus arboretum and a butterfly garden. The campus is home to two fish hatcheries, which raise muskellunge and Atlantic salmon as part of fish restoration and conservation efforts.

The Centre for Advancement of Water and Wastewater Technologies (CAWT) is also based at Frost Campus. The CAWT is an internationally recognized research institute that conducts research in the areas of water and wastewater treatment science. It is composed of scientists, faculty researchers, technologists, and a community of associates from academic, industrial, and private sectors.

In September 2008 the Frost Campus became home to the new joint degree-diploma in Ecological Restoration in partnership with Trent University. Students in the program spend two years at Fleming and two years at Trent. They graduate with an Honours B.Sc. and an Ontario College Diploma in Ecological Restoration.

Partnerships
The college has established pathways  from college to university through affiliations with a number of provincial, national and international post college institutions and universities. There is a specific program for students to move to Trent University.

In March 2022, the college launched a partnership with the semi-professional League1 Ontario  soccer expansion team Electric City FC for the use of its Sports Complex for the club's home games during its 2022 season.

Scholarships

Ensuring accessibility and financial aid for students in need is among the highest priorities at Fleming College. Fleming has provided more than $3.3 million to students in financial need through donor-sponsored scholarships and bursaries. Donor-sponsored student financial aid allows Fleming to support a diverse and vibrant student body, creating educational opportunities for students with exceptional promise.

Programs
Fleming College features more than 100 full-time programs in Arts and Heritage, Business, Environmental and Natural Resource Sciences, General Arts and Sciences, Health and Wellness, Justice and Community Development, Skilled Trades and Technology, and Continuing Education.

Fleming College is noted for its excellence in environmental and natural resources sciences as well as unique programs in business, museum management and cultural heritage, and social services. It also offers a number of post-graduate diplomas in Geographic Information Systems (GIS), Aquaculture, and Environmental Visual Communication. As well, Fleming College has a Computer Security and Investigations program, which is one of only three related programs in Canada.

Community involvement
Students are often involved in the communities Fleming serves, whether through work placements, volunteerism, or applied projects. Most recently, students hosted the Fleming College Police Foundations Outstanding Police Officer Service Award, participated in the Yellow Umbrella Project and Bell Let's Talk Day, and organized Big Brothers Big Sisters Come to Fleming day.

Student government
The social and political needs of students are served through the Student Administrative Council (SAC) at Sutherland Campus and the Frost Student Association (FSA) at Frost Campus. These are student-run corporations.

See also 
 Higher education in Ontario
 List of colleges in Ontario

References

External links

Colleges in Ontario
Education in Peterborough, Ontario
Modernist architecture in Canada
Educational institutions established in 1967
1967 establishments in Ontario